Year 131 (CXXXI) was a common year starting on Sunday (link will display the full calendar) of the Julian calendar. At the time, it was known as the Year of the Consulship of Laenas and Rufinus (or, less frequently, year 884 Ab urbe condita). The denomination 131 for this year has been used since the early medieval period, when the Anno Domini calendar era became the prevalent method in Europe for naming years.

Events 
 By place 

 Roman Empire 
 Emperor Hadrian builds the city Aelia Capitolina, on the location of Jerusalem.
 The Praetor's Edict is definitively codified by Salvius Julianus, on Hadrian's orders.  This change means that senatorial decrees become a mere confirmation of the imperial speech (oratio principis) which initiated them.
 Reorganization of the Imperial Council: Central administration is reinforced, and administrative positions are entrusted to knights, according to a very strict hierarchy. Under the reorganization, the Roman Senate is excluded from controlling the business of state.  
 Hadrian restores the monarchist policy of Claudius and Domitian.  The equestrian order is given full legal status, and attains the second order of the state.  
 Italy is divided into legal districts managed by consuls, a direct blow to the power and prestige of the Senate.

 By topic 

 Religion 
 The Edict of Hadrian prohibits the practice of circumcision. Additionally, Hadrian prohibits public reading of the Torah under penalty of death, as well as observance of festivals and the Sabbath, the teaching of Judaic Law, and the ordination of rabbis.
 The Temple of Baalshamin is built in Palmyra.

Births

Deaths 
 Joshua ben Hananiah, leading Jewish tanna

References